Giani (or Gyani) is an honorific Sikh title used by someone learned in the Sikh religion and who often leads the congregation in prayers, such as Ardas, or in singing (kirtan).

Giani may also refer to:

Given name 
 Giani Da Ros (born 1986), Italian professional road bicycle racer
 Giani Kiriţă (born 1977), Romanian football player
 Giani Esposito (1930–1974), French film actor and singer-songwriter

Surname 
 Andrea Giani (born 1970), Italian coach and retired volleyball player
 Dario Giani (born 1938), Italian rower
 Domenico Giani (born 1962), Italian military, former officer of the Guardia di Finanza and current Inspector General of the Corpo della Gendarmeria, in Vatican City
 Emanuel Giani Ruset (1715–1794), Prince of Wallachia and Prince of Moldavia, also known as Emanuel Giani Manolache
 Felice Giani (1758–1823), Italian painter of the Neoclassic style
 Gastón Giani (born 1979), Argentine male volleyball player
 Harinder Singh Giani (1938-2007, Indian eminent jurist
 Harpreet Singh Giani, Indian-born lawyer based in London
 Ito Giani (1941–2018), Italian sprinter
 Justo Giani (born 1999), Argentine professional footballer
 Louis Giani (born 1934), American wrestler
 Nicolas Giani (born 1986), Italian football defender

Other uses 
 ACS Cycling Chirio–Casa Giani (UCI Code: CHI), Italian professional cycling team based in Montechiaro d'Asti

See also 
 Gyan (disambiguation)
 Gianni, an Italian
 Gand (disambiguation)
 The Ghan, an Australian passenger train service